The 1964–65 Libyan Premier League was the second edition of the competition founded the year earlier. The competition consisted of three teams that had qualified by winning their regional leagues (known as Provincial Leagues). The three sides that participated were:

Al Hilal Benghazi (as Eastern Province champions)
Al Hilal Sebha (as Southern Province champions)
Al Ittihad Tripoli (as Western Province champions)

The Libyan Football Federation decided to withdraw Al Hilal Sebha from the competition, because they had withdrawn from the previous edition. This left the other two sides, who played each other home and away, to decide the championship.

First leg

Second leg

Al Ittihad Tripoli win the 1964-65 Libyan Premier League with a 2-1 aggregate scoreline.

Libyan Premier League seasons
Libya
Premier League